Patrick Unger (born 30 July 1982) is a German Grand Prix motorcycle racer.

Grand Prix motorcycle racing career

Races by year
(key) (Races in bold indicate pole position, races in italics indicate fastest lap)

References

1982 births
Living people
German motorcycle racers
125cc World Championship riders